Pristimantis lymani, also known as Lyman's robber frog, is a species of frog in the family Strabomantidae. It is found in southern Ecuador and northern Peru.
Its natural habitats are montane forests, sub-páramo, and páramo. These common frogs have been found under stones by streams as well as in large bromeliads on rocky slopes and cliffs. While common and having a stable population trend, it is suffering from habitat loss.

References

lymani
Amphibians of the Andes
Amphibians of Ecuador
Amphibians of Peru
Páramo fauna
Amphibians described in 1920
Taxonomy articles created by Polbot